William Rhodes (4 March 1883 – 5 August 1941) was an English first-class cricketer, who played one match for Yorkshire County Cricket Club in 1911, when he also played for the Second XI.  He bowled eleven overs of right arm pace for 40 runs, against the Indian Tourists at The Circle, Kingston upon Hull, but failed to take a wicket. Rhodes was left one not out in his only innings. Yorkshire won the match by an innings and 43 runs.

Rhodes was born in Bradford, Yorkshire, England, and died there in August 1941.

References

External links
Cricinfo Profile

1883 births
1941 deaths
Cricketers from Bradford
English cricketers of 1890 to 1918
English cricketers
Yorkshire cricketers